Dennis Daley (born August 7, 1996) is an American football  offensive tackle for the Tennessee Titans of the National Football League (NFL). He played college football at South Carolina.

Professional career

Carolina Panthers
Daley was drafted by the Carolina Panthers in the sixth round (212th overall) of the 2019 NFL Draft. He started nine games at left tackle his rookie season.

In 2020, Daley started three games, two at right guard and one at left tackle. On December 22, 2020, he was placed on injured reserve.

Daley started nine games in 2021 but played in 15.

Tennessee Titans
On August 29, 2022, Daley and a 2024 seventh-round pick were traded to the Tennessee Titans in exchange for a 2024 fifth-round pick. Daley was made the starting left tackle following an injury to Taylor Lewan on the first offensive play of the Titan's Week 2 game against the Buffalo Bills. He started for the Titans at left tackle for the rest of the season. Despite being part of the offensive line that blocked for Derrick Henry as he finished second in the league in rushing yards, Daley finished the season tied in the league for the most sacks allowed. At the end of the season, Pro Football Focus ranked the Titans' offensive line the worst in the league.

References

External links
South Carolina Gamecocks football bio
Official Dennis Daley

1996 births
Living people
Players of American football from Columbia, South Carolina
American football offensive linemen
South Carolina Gamecocks football players
Carolina Panthers players
Tennessee Titans players